The Day the Clown Cried is an unfinished and unreleased 1972 Swedish-French drama film directed by and starring Jerry Lewis. It is based on an original screenplay by Joan O'Brien and Charles Denton, from a story idea by O'Brien, with additional material from Lewis. The film was met with controversy regarding its premise and content, which features a circus clown who is imprisoned in a Nazi concentration camp.

Lewis repeatedly insisted that The Day the Clown Cried would never be released, but later donated an incomplete copy of the film to the Library of Congress in 2015 under the stipulation that it was not to be screened before June 2024. According to Lewis's son, there is no complete negative of the film, and outstanding copyright issues have prevented its release.

Plot
Helmut Doork is a washed-up German circus clown during the beginning of World War II and the Holocaust. Although he was once a famous performer who toured North America and Europe with the Ringling Brothers, Doork is now past his prime and receives little respect. After Doork causes an accident during a show, the head clown convinces the circus owner to demote Doork. Upon returning home, Doork confides his problems to his wife Ada, and she encourages him to stand up for himself. After going back to the circus, Helmut overhears the circus owner agreeing to fire him after the head clown issues an ultimatum. A distraught Helmut is arrested later by the Gestapo and the Schutzstaffel for ranting about Germany and drunkenly mocking Adolf Hitler in a bar. Following an interrogation at the Gestapo headquarters, he is imprisoned in a Nazi camp for political prisoners. For the next three to four years, he remains there while hoping for a trial and a chance to plead his case.

He tries to maintain his status among the other inmates by bragging about what a famous performer he once was. His only friend in prison is a good-hearted German named Johann Keltner, whose reason for being interned is never fully revealed but is implied to be his outspoken opposition to the Nazis. The camp receives a large group of Jewish prisoners, including several children. The other prisoners goad Doork into performing for them, but he does not realize that he actually is not very good. The other prisoners beat him up and leave him in the courtyard to sulk about his predicament. He sees a group of Jewish children laughing at him from the other side of the camp, where the Jewish prisoners are being kept away from everyone else. Delighted to be appreciated again, Helmut performs for them and gains an audience for a while, until the new prison commandant orders that he stop.

Helmut learns that fraternizing with Jewish prisoners is strictly forbidden. Unable to leave the children in a state of unhappiness, he continues to perform for them. The SS guards break up one of his performances; they knock him unconscious and warn the children away from the barbed-wire fence. Horrified, Keltner fights off one of the guards, but he is quickly cornered and beaten to death. Doork is placed in solitary confinement. Seeing a use for him, the commandant assigns him to help load Jewish children on trains leading out of the internment camp, with the promise his case will be reviewed. By a twist of fate, he ends up accidentally accompanying the children on a boxcar train to Auschwitz, and he is eventually used, in Pied Piper fashion, to help lead the Jewish children to their deaths in the gas chamber.

Knowing the fear the children will feel, he begs to be allowed to spend the last few moments with them. Leading them to the "showers", he becomes increasingly dependent on a miracle, but there is none. He is so filled with remorse that he remains with them, taking a young girl's hand and walks with them into the chamber.

Cast
 Jerry Lewis as Helmut Doork
 Harriet Andersson as Ada Doork
 Anton Diffring as Colonel Bestler
 Ulf Palme as Johann Keltner
 Pierre Étaix as Gustav the Great
 Tomas Bolme as Adolf
 Jonas Bergström as Franz
 Bo Brundin as Ludwig
 Lars Amble as Concentration camp guard
 Sven Lindberg, Fredrik Ohlsson as German officers
 Ulf Palme, John Elfström, Tor Isedal, Curt Broberg and Ulf von Zweigbergk as prisoners
 Heinz Hopf, Carl Billquist as Gestapo officers
 Nils Eklund as bartender
 Egil Holmsen as camp guard

Production

Development
In 1971, while performing at the Olympia Theatre, Lewis met with producer Nat Wachsberger, who offered him the chance to star in and direct the film with complete financial backing from his production company and Europa Studios. Before he had been given the offer, several stars such as Bobby Darin, Milton Berle, and Dick Van Dyke were also approached, but declined. Lewis was initially reluctant to take the role, especially after reading the script, stating in his autobiography Jerry Lewis in Person, "The thought of playing Helmut still scared the hell out of me". In addition, he felt that he was wrong for the part, due to the strong subject matter. He asked Wachsberger:

After re-reading Joan O'Brien and Charles Denton's first draft, Lewis felt that he would be doing something worthwhile in portraying the horrors of the Holocaust. He signed on to the project, but, in order to make it, he first had to arrange to perform at Caesars Palace in Las Vegas for a month, in order to fulfill the terms of his contract with the hotel. In February 1972, he toured the remains of Auschwitz and Dachau concentration camps and shot some exterior views of buildings in Paris for the film, all the while reworking the script. He lost thirty-five pounds in six weeks by eating nothing but grapefruit.

Filming
Principal photography began in Sweden during April 1972, but the shoot was beset by numerous problems. Film equipment was either lost or delivered late, and the necessary money was nowhere in sight. Lewis was repeatedly assured that money was forthcoming by Wachsberger, who did not appear at all on set.

Wachsberger not only ran out of money before completing the film, but his option to produce the film expired before filming began. He had paid O'Brien the initial $5,000 fee, but failed to send her the additional $50,000 due her prior to production. Lewis eventually ended up paying production costs with $2,000,000 of his own money to finish shooting the film, but the parties involved in its production were never able to come to terms that would allow the film to be released. O'Brien was shown a rough cut of the film in an attempt to acquire the necessary rights to release the film, but after viewing the product decided that it was not fit for release and, therefore, did not enter into an agreement with the producers or Lewis for the unauthorized, derivative work. After shooting wrapped, Lewis announced to the press that Wachsberger had failed to make good on his financial obligations or even commit to producing. Wachsberger retaliated by threatening to file a lawsuit of breach of contract and stated that he had enough to finish and release the film without Lewis. Wanting to ensure the film would not be lost, Lewis took a rough cut of the film, while the studio retained the entire film negative. On February 23, 1973, Lewis appeared as guest on The Dick Cavett Show, where he stated that the film would complete editing in six to seven weeks, that it had been invited to premiere at the Cannes Film Festival in May, and that it would be released in America after that. The film was never officially released and remains un-releasable due to the failure to secure the underlying rights from O'Brien.

Criticism and changes
The film became a source of legend almost immediately after its production. In May 1992, an article in Spy magazine quoted comedian and actor Harry Shearer, who saw a rough cut of the film in 1979:

Shearer, who did not know Lewis during the latter's lifetime, gave his opinion why Lewis would make the film: he believed "the Academy can't ignore this". When asked to sum up the experience of the film overall, he responded by saying that the closest he could come was like "if you flew down to Tijuana and suddenly saw a painting on black velvet of Auschwitz. You'd just think 'My God, wait a minute!' It's not funny, and it's not good, and somebody's trying too hard in the wrong direction to convey this strongly-held feeling."

The article quoted Joan O'Brien as saying the rough cut she saw was a "disaster". It also says she and the original script's co-author, Charles Denton, will never allow the film to be released, in part due to changes in the script made by Lewis that made the clown more sympathetic and Emmett Kelly-like. In the original script, the protagonist was an arrogant, self-centered clown named Karl Schmidt, who was "a real bastard", according to O'Brien. Her script reportedly had him trying to use his wife, who knew the ringmaster, to get him a better gig, and he apparently informed on nearly everyone he knew after being interrogated for mocking Hitler. She stated that the original draft was about the redemption of a selfish man, but that Lewis practically changed the entire story into a Chaplinesque dark comedy à la The Great Dictator.

Had producer Wachsberger retained rights to the material, Lewis would have had the option to adapt the screenplay, reshaping the protagonist. Without the rights, he was forced to seek author approval.

Historical controversy and praise
From 1949 to 1972, Lewis was known primarily for slapstick and sight gag comedy. Although he stated the film was a drama, there was a perception he would make irreverent humor from serious and horrific events. This production, ten years before his dramatic role in The King of Comedy, caused some to believe he was unsuited to the role. However, that did not prevent filmmaker Jean-Luc Godard from saying in an interview with Dick Cavett, "it is a great idea", "a beautiful idea", and that Lewis "should be supported" in his efforts.

In the June 2001 Spin article "Always Leave 'Em Laughing", author Bowman Hastie writes of Life Is Beautiful and Jakob the Liar, similar themed Holocaust films released twenty-plus years after Lewis' The Day the Clown Cried, "All three movies shamelessly use the Holocaust — and the impending death of children — as a vehicle for the star's most base, maudlin ideas about his own beneficent selflessness and humanity. But only Lewis has been vilified for it."

In the same article, comedian Janeane Garofalo provided a hint to another issue that has dogged Lewis's production: ridicule. An often polarizing figure, Lewis had detractors. Garofalo said, "Lewis's public criticism of younger comics ... only fuels Clown obsessives." Public readings of the script at comedy venues, halted by a cease and desist order (not by Lewis), provided opportunities to mock, as well as four decades of jokes and relentless interrogation of Lewis, shaped a perverse perception of the film.

In 2006, writer and editor Lawrence Levi wrote of his interview with Michael Barclay, who in 1991 was planning a new production of Clown, "The Clown screenplay was brilliant ... most of what has been written about the film is incorrect or unfair; he was particularly incensed by the comments of Harry Shearer (quoted in Spy 1992)."

On July 18, 2012, French director Xavier Giannoli stated on the France Inter film show Pendant les travaux, le cinéma reste ouvert that he had managed to track down a 75-minute copy of the film and that he had shown it to a number of people, among whom was noted French film critic Jean-Michel Frodon. In 2013, Frodon published a text dedicated to the film titled "Jerry Made his Day" in the anthology The Last Laugh. Strange Humors of Cinema edited by Murray Pomerance. The French version of the same text, titled "Le Jour de Jerry, et la nuit", was later published in the film journal Trafic.

In 2017, shortly after Lewis's death, Bruce Handy's article  in Vanity Fair, The French Critic Who Saw Jerry Lewis's Infamous Holocaust Movie and Loved It, brought to light a previously unpublished interview with Jean-Michel Frodon. The French critic claimed to have seen a copy of the film in 2004 or 2005 at the invitation of director Xavier Giannoli who owned a bootleg copy. Frodon did not know how Giannoli obtained his copy, and Giannoli declined Handy's request for comment. Frodon reported that while the copy he watched was obviously a rough preliminary edit, it generally followed the published script and did not seem to be missing any major story elements. His experience viewing the film is as follows,

Frodon further denies there is any sentimentality in the film, calling it "very meaningful" and stating Lewis is "not indulging himself, he is self-caricaturing. He is playing a very unsympathetic character. He's selfish and totally stupid. ... The film finds what I consider a cinematic answer to some real, serious issues, using a kind of stylized setting, both in the costumes and the sets. It's not pretending to be realistic. Instead, it has a very obvious fairy-tale feeling—not fairy tale, but tale. ... There are details like in the Grimm Brothers." and "For me, one of the many elements that draw such negative reaction to the film in the U.S. is that this performance is very far from what is expected from him." It was one of the earliest mainstream films to deal with the Holocaust and to directly depict the Nazi concentration camps.

Lewis interviews and responses
Due to the film's mystery and mythology, Lewis faced decades of questions by reporters.  Lewis offered the opinion that it was all bad, an artistic failure because "I lost the magic". Quoted in Entertainment Weekly: "You will never see it. No one will ever see it, because I am embarrassed at the poor work." In 2001, an 'inquisitive heckler' mentioned the film to Lewis during one of Lewis's motivational speeches, indicating that the man had heard the film might be eventually released. Lewis replied to this comment with "None of your goddamn business!" The same year, Lewis responded to a reporter's faxed request for information about the movie by calling and telling him: "As far as discussing [the movie], forget it! If you want to see any of it, forget it!" On January 12, 2013, Lewis appeared at a Cinefamily Q&A event at the Los Angeles Silent Movie Theatre. He was asked by actor Bill Allen, "Are we ever gonna get to see The Day the Clown Cried?" Lewis replied in the negative, and explained the reason the movie would never be released was because "in terms of that film I was embarrassed. I was ashamed of the work, and I was grateful that I had the power to contain it all, and never let anyone see it. It was bad, bad, bad." He then jokingly added, "But I'll tell you how it ends." At Cannes while promoting Max Rose, Lewis was asked about The Day the Clown Cried and said, "It was bad work. You'll never see it and neither will anyone else."

In October 2012, Australian-based film production company Traces Films recorded one of the most candid and emotional interviews with Jerry Lewis about The Day the Clown Cried. He states in his own words his motivation for taking on the project and his feelings during filmmaking. Shearer's conjectures aside, Lewis states his motivation for the project as such,
 

He further went on to say regarding the emotional toll and difficulty of the subject matter, "I had a talk with myself in the mirror and I said 'Understand one day you'll feel great and the next day you'll want to throw up because reading it disgusts you but playing it is a double disgust'." He said to The New York Times, "There's something about the risk, the courage that it takes to face the risk. ... I'm not going to get greatness unless I have to go at it with fear and uncertainty."

In a 2013 interview with Lewis, Chris Nashawaty of Entertainment Weekly wrote, 'When asked about all the speculation surrounding the film, he (Lewis) said, "I think it's like bad advertising.

Still, Lewis seemed to relish being the keeper of one of Hollywood's biggest mysteries. "The more I hear about it, the more I enjoy it."

Legacy
According to Richard Brody of The New Yorker, the film's grim portrayal of the holocaust "was, at the very least, unusual and original".

In the 2016 documentary The Last Laugh, which explored the limits of humor regarding the Holocaust, comedian David Cross reflected Lewis was "too ahead of his time. If he had waited 25 years, then he'd be bounding over those seats grabbing his Oscar". Similarly Amy Wallace in GQ Magazine wrote: "He was mercilessly criticized for attempting to mix comedy with the ultimate tragedy. However, in 1999, when Roberto Benigni's Life Is Beautiful won three Oscars for a similar story line, many noted that Lewis had tried it first."

After Lewis's death in August 2017, Richard Brody of The New Yorker wrote, "I don't know whether the film is as bad as Lewis himself has said that it is. The point is that, in the early 1970s, when the very term "the Holocaust" was hardly known and when the extermination of six million Jews by Nazi Germany was a little-discussed phenomenon, at a time before Claude Lanzmann made Shoah, Lewis took it on. He may have been naïve to do so with a twist of comedy, he may have been naïve to do so with such uncompromisingly direct and untroubled cinematic representation—but he also went where other directors didn't dare to go, taking on the horrific core of modern history and confronting its horrors. What childhood can there be with such knowledge, and what comedy? The moral complicity, the self-scourging accusation of the role of the clown in amusing children en route to their destruction, is itself as furious a challenge to himself, and to the entertainment of the time, as any by the most severe critic of media."

Lewis was at the forefront of what became a Hollywood genre, films exploring the events and personal experiences of the Holocaust. He was doing so at a time of virtually no Holocaust scholarship in academia, minimal recognition of the loss of European Yiddish culture, with limited public documentation, and only the initial stirrings of survivor testimonies.

Viewings and footage
On April 9, 2012, Flemish public service broadcaster VRT re-released—on its cultural website Cobra.be—a film piece its predecessor BRT had aired 40 years earlier to the day on the film show Première-Magazine. It includes behind-the-scenes footage shot in a Paris circus and some takes with sound from the film. On February 3, 2016, German public TV ARD aired a 2-hour documentary called Der Clown. German film maker Eric Friedler shows interviews, a 31-minute version of original footage and re-staged scenes from the original scripts with some Swedish actors who participated in Lewis's movie. Finally, the film shows the first full interview with Lewis about his work after 43 years. The documentary was later put on DVD and shown theatrically at the Deutsches Filminstitute. In June 2016, a 31-minute version from Der Clown was uploaded to YouTube and Vimeo by editor Kay Brown, and dubbed into German with English subtitles, marking the first time a version of The Day the Clown Cried was made available to the general public. It has since been removed.

Fans and critics alike hope for the film's eventual release. The Jerry Lewis official museum website (archived) states: "The film has been tied up in litigation ever since, and all of the parties involved have never been able to reach an agreeable settlement. Jerry hopes to someday complete the film, which remains to this day a significant expression of cinematic art, suspended in the abyss of international litigation".

In June 2018, at a public auction of items from the Lewis estate, were an original annotated script, polaroids of exteriors, and an original costume.

In a January 2019 interview with World Over, Lewis's son Chris stated there is no complete negative of the film and that outstanding copyright issues prevented a release.

Early possible remakes
Jim Wright revealed to the press his plan to produce a new version of The Day the Clown Cried, and he mentioned he had Richard Burton in mind for the title role. Despite major buzz about the project, nothing concrete came out of the planning stages. By 1991, producer Michael Barclay announced that he and Tex Rudloff (apparently with the help of Washington lobbyist Jack Abramoff) were preparing a joint production of Clown with the Russian film studio Lenfilm. Robin Williams had allegedly been offered the leading role and given a copy of the script. Jeremy Kagan, who made The Chosen (1981), reportedly was slated to direct the film, but once again the idea was dropped before it was officially greenlit. In 1994, William Hurt was considered to play the role, but nothing came to fruition.

Discussion of the film in the mainstream press was rekindled in the late 1990s due to the release of two films with similar themes, Life Is Beautiful (1997) and the remake of Jakob the Liar (1999). The latter starred Robin Williams, whose name had previously been attached to the planned remake. The film Adam Resurrected (2009), adapted from Yoram Kaniuk's novel of the same name published in 1968, has also drawn comparisons.

Possession by the Library of Congress
On August 5, 2015, the Los Angeles Times reported that Lewis had donated a copy of the film to the Library of Congress, under the stipulation that it not be screened before June 2024. The Library of Congress intends to eventually screen it at its Audio Visual Conservation campus in Culpeper, Virginia. Rob Stone, curator of the Library of Congress, has stated that they will not be able to loan the film to other theaters or museums without permission from Lewis' estate. Stone has also stated that they do not have any intent to release the film in any form of home media. In a December 2018 article for The New York Times, Stone stated the LOC does not have a complete print of the film.

See also
 List of Holocaust films
 List of World War II films

References

External links
 
 Jerry Lewis' The Day the Clown Cried Revealed!, Film Threat
 Film summary from The Official Jerry Lewis Comedy Museum
 "Jerry Lewis Goes to Death Camp" 1992 Spy magazine article on The Day the Clown Cried, including commentary from cast members and people who purport to have seen the rough cut
 
 
 

Swedish drama films
French drama films
1970s English-language films
Films directed by Jerry Lewis
Films shot in Paris
Films shot in Stockholm
Films shot in Sweden
Holocaust films
Films about clowns
Films with screenplays by Jerry Lewis
1970s unfinished films
1970s French films
1970s Swedish films